Santiago Ezquerro Cordón (born 11 September 1981) is a retired Spanish sprinter who specialised in the 400 metres. He represented his country at three World Indoor Championships. He officially retired in 2014, having been unable to compete due to injuries since 2010.

International competitions

Personal bests
Outdoor
200 metres – 21.40 (+1.9 m/s, Seville 2004)
400 metres – 46.70 (Barcelona 2008)
Indoor
200 metres – 21.09 (Valencia 2003)
400 metres – 46.83 (Valencia 2010)

References

1981 births
Living people
Spanish male sprinters
Sportspeople from Logroño
Mediterranean Games gold medalists for Spain
Mediterranean Games medalists in athletics
Athletes (track and field) at the 2009 Mediterranean Games
21st-century Spanish people